The 1973–74 Boston Celtics season was their 28th in the National Basketball Association (NBA). The Celtics won their 12th title, as well as their division for the third consecutive season. This was their 13th finals appearance, and first since 1968–69.

Roster

Regular season

Season standings

Record vs. opponents

Game log

Playoffs

|- align="center" bgcolor="#ccffcc"
| 1
| March 30
| Buffalo
| W 107–97
| Jo Jo White (24)
| Dave Cowens (18)
| John Havlicek (12)
| Boston Garden14,300
| 1–0
|- align="center" bgcolor="#ffcccc"
| 2
| April 2
| @ Buffalo
| L 105–115
| Jo Jo White (27)
| Dave Cowens (16)
| John Havlicek (7)
| Buffalo Memorial Auditorium17,507
| 1–1
|- align="center" bgcolor="#ccffcc"
| 3
| April 3
| Buffalo
| W 120–107
| John Havlicek (43)
| Dave Cowens (19)
| John Havlicek (8)
| Boston Garden14,656
| 2–1
|- align="center" bgcolor="#ffcccc"
| 4
| April 6
| @ Buffalo
| L 102–104
| Don Nelson (24)
| Dave Cowens (14)
| John Havlicek (8)
| Buffalo Memorial Auditorium18,119
| 2–2
|- align="center" bgcolor="#ccffcc"
| 5
| April 9
| Buffalo
| W 100–97
| John Havlicek (25)
| Dave Cowens (12)
| Art Williams (8)
| Boston Garden15,320
| 3–2
|- align="center" bgcolor="#ccffcc"
| 6
| April 12
| @ Buffalo
| W 106–104
| John Havlicek (30)
| Dave Cowens (17)
| John Havlicek (7)
| Buffalo Memorial Auditorium18,257
| 4–2
|-

|- align="center" bgcolor="#ccffcc"
| 1
| April 14
| New York
| W 113–88
| John Havlicek (25)
| Dave Cowens (13)
| John Havlicek (12)
| Boston Garden14,101
| 1–0
|- align="center" bgcolor="#ccffcc"
| 2
| April 16
| @ New York
| W 111–99
| John Havlicek (27)
| Dave Cowens (18)
| Jo Jo White (6)
| Madison Square Garden19,694
| 2–0
|- align="center" bgcolor="#ffcccc"
| 3
| April 19
| New York
| L 100–103
| Dave Cowens (28)
| Dave Cowens (22)
| Art Williams (5)
| Boston Garden15,320
| 2–1
|- align="center" bgcolor="#ccffcc"
| 4
| April 21
| @ New York
| W 98–91
| John Havlicek (36)
| Paul Silas (14)
| Jo Jo White (9)
| Madison Square Garden19,694
| 3–1
|- align="center" bgcolor="#ccffcc"
| 5
| April 24
| New York
| W 105–94
| John Havlicek (33)
| Dave Cowens (14)
| John Havlicek (5)
| Boston Garden15,320
| 4–1
|-

|- align="center" bgcolor="#ccffcc"
| 1
| April 28
| @ Milwaukee
| W 98–83
| John Havlicek (26)
| Dave Cowens (17)
| Cowens, White (7)
| Milwaukee Arena10,938
| 1–0
|- align="center" bgcolor="#ffcccc"
| 2
| April 30
| @ Milwaukee
| L 96–105 (OT)
| Jo Jo White (25)
| Dave Cowens (11)
| Dave Cowens (6)
| Milwaukee Arena10,938
| 1–1
|- align="center" bgcolor="#ccffcc"
| 3
| May 3
| Milwaukee
| W 95–83
| Dave Cowens (30)
| John Havlicek (12)
| Jo Jo White (8)
| Boston Garden15,320
| 2–1
|- align="center" bgcolor="#ffcccc"
| 4
| May 5
| Milwaukee
| L 89–97
| John Havlicek (33)
| Paul Silas (12)
| Jo Jo White (9)
| Boston Garden15,320
| 2–2
|- align="center" bgcolor="#ccffcc"
| 5
| May 7
| @ Milwaukee
| W 96–87
| Havlicek, Cowens (28)
| Paul Silas (16)
| Dave Cowens (6)
| Milwaukee Arena10,938
| 3–2
|- align="center" bgcolor="#ffcccc"
| 6
| May 10
| Milwaukee
| L 101–102 (2OT)
| John Havlicek (36)
| Havlicek, Silas (9)
| Jo Jo White (11)
| Boston Garden15,320
| 3–3
|- align="center" bgcolor="#ccffcc"
| 7
| May 12
| @ Milwaukee
| W 102–87
| Dave Cowens (28)
| Dave Cowens (14)
| Havlicek, Westphal (6)
| Milwaukee Arena10,938
| 4–3
|-

References

 Celtics on Database Basketball
 Celtics on Basketball Reference

Boston Celtics
Boston Celtics seasons
Eastern Conference (NBA) championship seasons
NBA championship seasons
Boston Celtics
Boston Celtics
Celtics
Celtics